The New Zealand national cricket team toured the West Indies from March to May 1996 and played a two-match Test series against the West Indies cricket team which the West Indies won 1–0. New Zealand were captained by Lee Germon; the West Indies by Courtney Walsh. In addition, the teams played a five-match Limited Overs International (LOI) series which the West Indies won 3–2.

One Day Internationals (ODIs)

The West Indies won the series 3-2.

1st ODI

2nd ODI

3rd ODI

4th ODI

5th ODI

Test series summary

First Test

Second Test

References

External links

1996 in New Zealand cricket
1996 in West Indian cricket
1995-96
International cricket competitions from 1994–95 to 1997
West Indian cricket seasons from 1970–71 to 1999–2000